Bora–Hansgrohe (UCI Code: BOH) is a UCI WorldTeam cycling team established in 2010 with a German license, founded and managed by Ralph Denk. It is sponsored by BORA, a German manufacturer of extractor hoods and cooktops, and Hansgrohe, a bathroom fittings manufacturer. Its aim is "improving the image of road cycling in Germany".

History

The team was formed in 2010 as Team NetApp, a UCI Continental Team with 14 riders. It was promoted to ProContinental Team status after the first season.

For the 2013 season, Team NetApp and British based  merged to form NetApp-Endura. The team's 2013 roster consisted of eight riders from Endura, and 12 riders from Team NetApp, as well as NetApp bringing the Pro Continental licence. The eight Endura riders joining were Alexander Wetterhall, Erick Rowsell, Iker Camaño, Jonathan McEvoy, Paul Voß, Russell Downing, Scott Thwaites, Zak Dempster. The nine NetApp riders retained were Jan Barta, Cesare Benedetti, Markus Eichler, Bartosz Huzarski, Blaz Jarc, Leopold Koenig, Daniel Schorn, Andreas Schillinger, Michael Schwarzmann.

On the first rest day of the 2014 Tour de France, 15 July 2014, the team announced they had secured sponsorship with German cooking surface and extractor manufacturer BORA. The team for 2015 onwards, thus becoming known as Team BORA. BORA became the first German team with a German title sponsor in the professional peloton since 2010. Team manager Ralph Denk expressed hope that BORA's backing would help the team achieve their aim of joining the UCI World Tour by 2017.
After the end of the 2014 Tour de France, it was announced that starting in 2015 the team would ride bicycles from Canadian company, Argon 18, which would also be the team's second title sponsor. During this relationship, a glass kitchen was installed allowing fans to watch the chef, like a zoo, and advertise the Bora air extractor.

In late June 2016, days before the 2016 Tour de France, the team announced that from 2017 the team name would change from Bora-Argon 18 to Bora–Hansgrohe. Hansgrohe is a bathroom products manufacturer with previous involvement in cyclo-cross, recently sponsoring the Superprestige series. Following the announcement that Peter Sagan would join the team on a three-year deal from 2017, Specialized Bicycle Components announced in August 2016 that they would replace Argon 18 as the team's bike sponsor, having also agreed to a three-year agreement to supply the team's bicycles, helmets, shoes, tires, and wheels.

On 1 August 2017, the team announced the signings of Peter Kennaugh on a two-year deal and Daniel Oss for the 2018 season. As of 2018 approximately 95% of funding comes from sponsorship; in order to develop, team manager Denk aims to reduce this to 50%.

Doping
In July 2017, the team revealed that former rider Ralf Matzka returned an adverse analytical finding for Tamoxifen on March 3, 2016, Matzka did not ride for the team after the Tour of Flanders. Tamoxifen usage can lead to an increase in the concentrations of testosterone within the body.

Team roster

Major wins

National, continental, world and Olympic champions 

2011
 South Africa Time Trial, Daryl Impey
2012
 Czech Republic Time Trial, Jan Bárta
2013
 Czech Republic Time Trial, Jan Bárta
 Czech Republic Road Race, Jan Bárta
2014
 Czech Republic Time Trial, Jan Bárta
2015
 Czech Republic Time Trial, Jan Bárta
 German Road Race, Emanuel Buchmann
2016
 Portuguese Road Race, José Mendes
2017
 Latvia Time Trial, Aleksejs Saramotins
 Czech Republic Time Trial, Jan Bárta
 Austria Road Race, Gregor Mühlberger
 Slovakian Road Race, Juraj Sagan
 German Road Race, Marcus Burghardt
 World Road Race, Peter Sagan
2018
 Polish Time Trial, Maciej Bodnar
 Slovakian Road Race, Peter Sagan
 Austria Road Race, Lukas Pöstlberger
 German Road Race, Pascal Ackermann
2019
 Polish Time Trial, Maciej Bodnar
 German Road Race, Maximilian Schachmann
 Italy Road Race, Davide Formolo
 Ireland Road Race, Sam Bennett
 Slovakian Road Race, Juraj Sagan
 Austria Road Race, Patrick Konrad
2020
 Slovakian Road Race, Juraj Sagan
2021
 Polish Time Trial, Maciej Bodnar
 Austria Road Race, Patrick Konrad
 German Road Race, Maximilian Schachmann
 Slovakian Road Race, Peter Sagan
 Olympic omnium, Matthew Walls
2022
 New Zealand Criterium, Shane Archbold
 Colombian Road Race, Sergio Higuita
 Austria Time Trial, Felix Großschartner
 German Road Race, Nils Politt

References

External links

 

2010 establishments in Germany
 
Cycling teams based in Germany
Cycling teams established in 2010
Specialized Bicycle Components
UCI WorldTeams